Romel Oswaldo Morales Ramírez (born 23 August 1997) is a Colombian professional footballer who plays as a midfielder for Malaysia Super League club Kuala Lumpur City.

Club career
Morales started a Churta-Millos soccer school in Bogotá, then decided by his parents to head south of the continent where he initially arrived at the River Plate at 14 years of age with Eder Alvarez Balanta.

Banfield
In 2014, Morales moved to Argentinian club Banfield. He made his professional debut on 20 March 2016, replacing Walter Erviti in 1–1 draw against River Plate at Antonio Vespucio Liberti Monumental Stadium in Buenos Aires.

Selangor II
After six years in Argentina, he decided to continue his career in Malaysia, where he signed with Selangor II.

He made his debut on 3 February 2018, in a 2–2 draw against Terengganu II.

Melaka United
On 12 November 2019, Melaka United announced the signing of Morales for the following Malaysia Super League season.

Kuala Lumpur City
Morales joined Malaysia Super League club Kuala Lumpur City in January 2021. He was part of the team that won the 2021 Malaysia Cup and emerged top scorer of the competition.

Career statistics

Club

Honours
Kuala Lumpur City
 Malaysia Cup: 2021
 AFC Cup runner-up: 2022

References

External links
 
 De Colombia a Malasia: Romel Morales, el juvenil que quiere triunfar en el Sudeste Asiático - Golombiano

Living people
1997 births
Colombian footballers
Association football midfielders
Malaysia Super League players
Club Atlético Banfield footballers
PKNS F.C. players
Melaka United F.C. players
Kuala Lumpur City F.C. players
Colombian expatriate footballers
Colombian expatriate sportspeople in Argentina
Expatriate footballers in Argentina
Colombian expatriate sportspeople in Malaysia
Expatriate footballers in Malaysia
Argentine Primera División players
People from Villavicencio